Himansu Kumar Bose (1904–1971) was an Indian Judge and former Chief Justice of the Calcutta High Court.

Career
Himansu Kumar Bose passed M.A., B.L. from the University of Calcutta and became a barrister from London. He joined as a practitioner of the Calcutta High Court. He was appointed the Chief Justice of Calcutta High Court in 1961 after Justice Surajit Chandra Lahiri. Justice Bose retired in 1966.

References

People from Kolkata
Indian judges
Judges of the Calcutta High Court
Chief Justices of the Calcutta High Court
Indian barristers
1904 births
1971 deaths
University of Calcutta alumni